Maramly (also, Mirally) is a village in the Sabirabad Rayon of Azerbaijan.

References 

Populated places in Sabirabad District